Carlos Cornes Ribadas (born April 29, 1989 in Spain in Santiago de Compostela) is a former professional squash player who represented Spain. He reached a career-high world ranking of World No. 68 in February 2020.

References

External links 
 
 
 

Spanish male squash players
Living people
1989 births